Wan Kin Yee (born July 20, 1975) is a track and field sprint athlete who competes internationally for Hong Kong.

Wan represented Hong Kong at the 2008 Summer Olympics in Beijing. She competed at the 100 metres sprint and placed sixth in her heat without advancing to the second round. She ran the distance in a time of 12.37 seconds.

She married fellow sprinter Pat Kwok Wai in 2002. She held the Hong Kong record for the women's 100 metres sprint from 1999 until February 2017, when it was broken by Chan Pui-kei.

References

1975 births
Living people
Hong Kong female sprinters
Olympic athletes of Hong Kong
Athletes (track and field) at the 2008 Summer Olympics
Athletes (track and field) at the 1998 Asian Games
Athletes (track and field) at the 2002 Asian Games
Athletes (track and field) at the 2006 Asian Games
Athletes (track and field) at the 2010 Asian Games
Asian Games competitors for Hong Kong